Denney is a surname, and may refer to:

 Alex Denney, Australian rules footballer with the Collingwood Football Club.
 Dan Denney, aviation designer
 John Denney, American football player
 Kevin Denney, singer
 Mark Denney, rugby player
 Nora "Dodo" Denney, actress
 Reuel Denney, poet
 Robert Vernon Denney, politician
 Ryan Denney, American football player
 Thomas F. Denney (1874–1913), American politician
 Travis Denney, badminton player
 William D. Denney, American businessman and politician, Governor of Delaware

See also

Denny (surname)